Jutland Mountain is a mountain on Vancouver Island, British Columbia, Canada, located  west of Courtenay and  northeast of Mount Albert Edward.

See also
 List of mountains in Canada

References

Vancouver Island Ranges
One-thousanders of British Columbia
Clayoquot Land District